KOFP-LP is a low power radio station broadcasting licensed to Fresno, California. It is licensed to the Idefua Foundation for African Arts and Culture.

History
KOFP-LP began broadcasting on April 14, 2015.

References

External links
 

Mass media in Fresno, California
2016 establishments in California
OFP-LP
OFP-LP
Radio stations established in 2015